Dawn Kurtagich (born ) is a psychological horror and young adult fiction author. She lives in Wales though she grew up in a number of places around the world, including mostly within Africa. Her mother was single and a globe trotter and missionary. Kurtagich was born in the late 1980s. In 2011 she was ill with liver failure recovering after a transplant, and she used that and her experience of someone she knew who had Dissociative Identity Disorder to write her first novel. That novel is described as Young Adult fiction but reviewers firmly place it as something for over fifteens. A companion novella was produced to go with her first novel.

Bibliography
The Dead House
And the Trees Crept In
Teeth in the Mist
The Creeper Man

References and sources

Living people
British women novelists
1980s births
Welsh writers
British horror writers
Place of birth missing (living people)